Coleophora majuscula is a moth of the family Coleophoridae. It is found in Azerbaijan.

The larvae feed on Acanthophyllum mucronatum. They feed on the leaves of their host plant.

References

majuscula
Moths described in 1991
Moths of Asia